Saulius Ambrulevičius (born 10 June 1992) is a Lithuanian ice dancer. As a single skater, he is the 2007 and 2008 Lithuanian national champion. Competing in ice dancing with Taylor Tran, he is the 2015 Pavel Roman Memorial silver medalist and 2015 Lithuanian national champion. They qualified to the free dance at the 2017 European Championships.

Career

Single skating 
Ambrulevičius was born in Kaunas and began learning to skate in 1998. He won the Lithuanian senior title for the first time in 2007. His first major international competition was the 2007 Junior Worlds; he placed 45th in the short program and did not qualify for the free skate.

In the 2007–08 season, Ambrulevičius won his second national title. He competed in the 2008 Junior Worlds and once again placed last, this time 47th. He competed at the 2008 World Championships, where he finished 45th.

Partnership with Tran 
Around July 2014, Ambrulevičius teamed up with American skater Taylor Tran to compete in ice dancing for Lithuania. Their international debut came at the Tallinn Trophy in December 2014. At the Estonian event, they finished 5th and earned the minimum scores to appear at the 2015 European Championships in Stockholm. They missed the cut for the free dance in Sweden and at the 2016 European Championships in Bratislava, Slovakia.

Tran/Ambrulevičius qualified to the final segment at the 2017 European Championships in Ostrava, Czech Republic; they ranked 20th in the short dance, 17th in the free, and 18th overall. They announced the end of their partnership in April 2017, following the 2017 World Championships.

Partnership with Reed 
Ambrulevičius teamed up with American ice dancer Allison Reed in spring 2017. Representing Lithuania, they made their competitive debut at the 2017 CS Ondrej Nepela Trophy in September. By placing fifteenth at the 2021 World Championships in Stockholm, Reed/Ambrulevičius qualified for a place for a Lithuanian dance team at the 2022 Winter Olympics. However, Reed's application for Lithuanian citizenship was denied, thus ending their bid for the Winter Olympics.

Programs

With Reed

With Tran

Single skating

Competitive highlights
GP: Grand Prix; CS: Challenger Series; JGP: Junior Grand Prix

Ice dancing

With Reed

With Tran

Singles career

References

External links 

 
 
 

Lithuanian male ice dancers
Lithuanian male single skaters
1992 births
Living people
Sportspeople from Kaunas
Competitors at the 2011 Winter Universiade